Martyn Thomas Waghorn (born 23 January 1990) is an English professional footballer who plays as a forward for EFL Championship club Huddersfield Town on loan from Coventry City. He is a former England under-21 international. 

Waghorn had been with Sunderland since the age of eight and made his first-team debut for the club in December 2007, against Manchester United, at the age of 17. He had loan spells with Charlton Athletic and Leicester City, before joining Leicester City on a permanent deal in August 2010. He played sparingly for Leicester City, spending time out on loan at Hull City, Millwall and Wigan Athletic, before signing permanently for the latter in April 2014. In July 2015, he left England for the first time, joining Scottish club Rangers. He returned to English football in August 2017, when he joined Ipswich Town and later Derby County before signing for Coventry City in July 2021.

Club career

Sunderland

Waghorn was born in South Shields, Tyne and Wear. From the age of eight Waghorn played for his local team Sunderland and he progressed through the youth system at the Academy of Light to reach the under-18 team. Waghorn scored the first hat-trick of his career on 12 December 2007 in a 6–1 win against Norwich City in the FA Youth Cup third round. He scored twice in a 4–2 win against local rivals Newcastle United a few days later at the Academy of Light, both of the goals being penalties.

Waghorn made his first team debut against Manchester United at the Stadium of Light on 26 December 2007; the match finished 4–0 to Manchester United. The player, usually a striker, had to play in left midfield, and after the match manager Roy Keane heaped praise on the young player, predicting that he would have a "long and successful career". Waghorn signed a new two-and-a-half-year contract with Sunderland in February 2008, which Keane described as good for both Sunderland and the player. His only appearance for the club in the 2008–09 season was against Chelsea at Stamford Bridge on 1 November 2008, a 5–0 loss.

Waghorn joined Championship side Charlton Athletic on a month's loan on 17 November 2008. On 15 December 2008, Waghorn scored his first goal, in a 2–2 draw at home against Derby County. The loan deal was extended for a second month. He made seven appearances for the club in a season that would end in relegation to League One.

Leicester City

On 6 August 2009, Waghorn joined Leicester City on loan until 11 January 2010, having turned down interest from Carlisle United. Waghorn made his competitive debut for Leicester City as a substitute against Swansea City, scoring the equalising goal as Leicester City won 2–1. His first 11 games for Leicester City were all as a substitute, but Waghorn expressed his satisfaction as an impact player. He made his first league start for Leicester City against Reading, scoring the winning goal. Waghorn scored his first professional brace against Queens Park Rangers in a 4–0 win. His overall performance earned him the club's Young Player of the Year award on 28 April 2010. Waghorn missed the last penalty kick in a 4–3 defeat on penalties to Cardiff City in the Championship play-offs semi-final second leg on 12 May 2010. He scored 12 goals in 28 starts for the club during his loan period.

On 31 August 2010, Waghorn rejoined Leicester City on a permanent deal for a fee rising to £3 million to help fund Sunderland's record signing Asamoah Gyan. He was disappointed with the lack of opportunities at his former club, and happily dropped down a division because the lure of playing regular football was too good to turn down. Waghorn made his debut in a 1–1 draw against Coventry City on 11 September 2010, scoring his first goal in a 4–3 defeat to Norwich City on 28 September 2010. He failed to win a regular place when Sven-Göran Eriksson became manager on 3 October 2010. Nonetheless, injury concerns at the club prevented Waghorn from joining Derby County on loan during the January 2011 transfer window. On 6 April 2011, a hamstring injury suffered during training ruled Waghorn out for the rest of the 2010–11 season.

Hull City completed the loan signing of Waghorn on 31 August 2011 which would have lasted until January 2012. He made his debut on 10 September 2011 in a 1–0 win at Peterborough United. On 27 September 2011 against Doncaster Rovers at the Keepmoat Stadium, Matty Fryatt found himself with space to deliver a low cross along the six-yard box and although Neil Sullivan might have been disappointed not to cut it out, Waghorn was there to apply the finish from close range. He returned to Leicester on 6 December 2011 after suffering a hamstring injury during his loan spell.

After making only two substitute appearances for Leicester, Waghorn joined Millwall on a three-month loan deal on 12 September 2013. He scored on his debut against Derby County on 14 September 2013. He scored his second goal for the club on 5 October 2013, in a 5–2 defeat against AFC Bournemouth.

Wigan Athletic
On 31 January 2014, Waghorn joined Wigan Athletic on loan until the end of the season. He made his debut on 8 February 2014 in a Championship match away to Huddersfield Town in a 1–0 defeat. His first goal for Wigan Athletic came against Barnsley ten days later. After scoring three goals in nine appearances, Waghorn joined Wigan Athletic permanently on 4 April 2014, on a free transfer.

Rangers

On 20 July 2015, Waghorn signed a three-year deal with Scottish Championship side Rangers along with Wigan teammate James Tavernier. He continued using 33 as his squad number, as with previous clubs, due to superstition. Waghorn scored a double on his debut for Rangers in the Scottish Challenge Cup against Hibernian on 25 July 2015 in a 6–2 win. He netted twice from the penalty-spot in a 5–1 defeat of Queen of the South on 30 August 2015. He scored twice from the penalty spot again in a 5–0 win over Raith Rovers at Ibrox on 5 September 2015. His striking dominance continued when he scored two goals in a 2–1 win over Dumbarton on 21 September 2015.

He scored his first senior hat-trick in a 4–0 win over Greenock Morton on 27 September 2015, taking his league goal tally to 11 and his overall tally to 14, making him the leading goal scorer in the league. He received the Scottish Championship Player of the Month Award for September due to his performances on the pitch. He then scored two goals in a 4–0 victory against Alloa Athletic on 7 November 2015, taking his overall tally to 17 goals. He scored another treble in a 5–1 victory over Cowdenbeath in the fourth round of the Scottish Cup. On 16 February 2016, Waghorn sustained a knee ligament injury in Rangers's 2–1 win over Kilmarnock after being tackled by former Rangers defender Steven Smith and was ruled out for 6–8 weeks. He did not return until the final league match of the season against St Mirren on 1 May 2016. Waghorn also played in the 2016 Scottish Cup Final but could not prevent Rangers losing the match 3–2.

In the summer of 2016, Waghorn was offered a contract extension by Rangers, which was rejected. This led to him being linked with a possible move to Bristol City. However, it did not affect his goalscoring form, as Waghorn netted five in his first four games with strikes against Motherwell, Annan Athletic and a brace against Stranraer before scoring Rangers first Scottish Premiership goal of the season in a 1–1 draw at home to Hamilton Academical. In that same match against Hamilton Academical, Waghorn suffered a hamstring strain, which kept him out of football until mid-September 2016. Upon his return from injury, Waghorn struggled for goal-scoring form, although he did net the third hat-trick of his Rangers career in a League Cup match against Queen of the South. However, he did not score in the league from the opening day fixture until 16 December, when he netted a brace away to Hamilton Academical.

Ipswich Town
On 7 August 2017, Waghorn joined Ipswich Town on a two-year contract. Five days later, he scored the winning goal on his league debut, in a 2–1 victory over Barnsley. Following on from scoring on his debut, he scored a brace in the following league game in a 4–3 away win over Millwall at The Den. He scored in his third consecutive league appearance on 19 August, scoring in a 2–0 home win over Brentford at Portman Road. Waghorn became a regular starter in the Ipswich first-team during his first season at the club. On 6 March he netted a brace in a 2–1 away win over Sheffield Wednesday at Hillsborough, including scoring a late free-kick from outside the 18 yard box. He scored another brace on 2 April against Millwall in a match that ended in a 2–2 draw. He finished the season as the club's top scorer with 16 league goals.

Derby County
Waghorn was reportedly set to join Middlesbrough from Ipswich following the conclusion of the 2017/18 season. However Derby County swooped in at the last second and on 8 August 2018 he was announced as a Rams player. Upon signing, Waghorn became the seventh signing for Frank Lampard, and was given the number 9. He made his debut on 11 August in a 1–4 loss against Leeds United.

On the final day of the 2020/21 Season Derby hosted Sheffield Wednesday in which defeat for The Rams would have seen them relegated to League One at the expense of Wednesday. In what turned out to be his final game as a Derby player and with the score at 2-3 to the visitors Waghorn stepped up to take a penalty and by converting the spot kick which would ultimately turn out to be the last goal of the game, he saved the club from relegation.

Coventry City
On 2 July 2021, Waghorn joined Coventry City on a two-year contract following the expiration of his Derby contract.

In the 2021-22 season Waghorn struggled to hold down a consistent place in The Sky Blues’ starting eleven and only managed to find the back of the net once over the course of the season which was the final goal in a 2-0 win against Middlesbrough at the Coventry Building Society Arena.

After 404 days, Waghorn finally netted his second Sky Blues’ goal with a vital penalty kick late on in a 1-0 win over Sheffield United.

Huddersfield Town (loan)
On 13 January 2023, Waghorn joined fellow EFL Championship side Huddersfield Town for the remainder of the 2022–23 season.

International career
Waghorn represented England at under-19 level twice, against Spain and Bosnia and Herzegovina.

Waghorn was included in the 27-man England under-21 squad to face both Azerbaijan and Israel in September 2011. He made his debut in the game against Azerbaijan, a 6–0 victory, and scored a goal in the 79th minute, having come on as a substitute 12 minutes earlier. In his second appearance for the under-21 team, Waghorn was in the starting line-up, scoring a header against Israel from an Alex Oxlade-Chamberlain cross.

Career statistics

Honours

Club
Rangers
Scottish Championship: 2015–16
Scottish Challenge Cup: 2015–16

Individual
Leicester City Young Player of the Year: 2009–10
Scottish Championship Player of the Month: September 2015
Scottish Championship top scorer: 2015–16
Rangers Players' Player of the Year: 2015–16
PFA Scotland Team of the Year: 2015–16 Scottish Championship

References

External links

1990 births
Living people
Footballers from South Shields
English footballers
England youth international footballers
England under-21 international footballers
Association football forwards
Sunderland A.F.C. players
Charlton Athletic F.C. players
Leicester City F.C. players
Hull City A.F.C. players
Millwall F.C. players
Wigan Athletic F.C. players
Rangers F.C. players
Ipswich Town F.C. players
Derby County F.C. players
Coventry City F.C. players
Huddersfield Town A.F.C. players
Premier League players
English Football League players
Scottish Professional Football League players